Ledbetter is an unincorporated community on U.S. Route 290 in far northern Fayette County, Texas, United States. Ledbetter has a post office with the ZIP code 78946.

Climate
The climate in this area is characterized by hot, humid summers and generally mild to cool winters.  According to the Köppen Climate Classification system, Ledbetter has a humid subtropical climate, abbreviated "Cfa" on climate maps.

References

External links
 LEDBETTER, TX Handbook of Texas Online.

Unincorporated communities in Fayette County, Texas
Unincorporated communities in Texas